La Stagione Frankfurt is a German ensemble of Baroque and classical music, adept at historically informed performance.

History 
The ensemble La Stagione Frankfurt was founded in 1988 by the German flautist and conductor Michael Schneider around the members of the ensemble Camerata Köln.

Schneider began his career as a solo flutist by winning a prize at the 1978 ARD International Competition in Munich. In 1979, he was one of the founding members of the chamber music ensemble Camerata Köln.

In 1988, he founded the ensemble La Stagione Frankfurt with which he recorded more than 100 discs in the genres of opera, oratorio and symphony, in the spirit of historically informed interpretation, i.e. on period instruments (or copies of period instruments).

The ensemble calls itself "Die Klang-Gourmets", i.e. "The gourmets of sound"..

The Stagione Frankfurt is supported by the Ministry of Culture and Science of the State of Hesse.

Repertoire 
An important aspect of the work of the ensemble La Stagione Frankfurt, whose motto is "Unerhörtes hörbar machen" (and "Bringing the undiscovered to your ears"), is the rediscovery of little-known works.

Collaborations 
La Stagione works with many soloists such as Claron McFadden, Christoph Prégardien and his son Julian, Gotthold Schwarz, Simone Kermes, Nuria Rial, Emma Kirkby, Barbara Schlick, Sandrine Piau and Klaus Mertens.

Critical reception 
For the Early Music Review

For the Bach Cantatas website, Michael Schneider's versatility on the one hand, and the musicians' artistic flexibility on the other, allow a convincing and authentic performance of a wide range of works from the baroque to the classical symphonies and the contemporary repertoire.

Recordings 
La Stagione Frankfurt has made numerous recordings for the following labels cpo, Cappriccio, Deutsche Harmonia Mundi and Koch-Classics:
 1991:  by Alessandro Scarlatti (Capriccio)
 1992: Paride et Elena by Christoph Willibald Gluck, with soprano Claron McFadden
 1993: Symphonies op.10  by Karl Friedrich Abel
 1993: 4 Flute concertos by Karl Friedrich Abel
 1993: Piramo e Tisbe by Johann Adolph Hasse, with soprano Barbara Schlick
 1995: Günther von Schwarzburg by Ignaz Holzbauer
 1996: Concerti by Georg Matthias Monn, with cellist Rainer Zipperling, harpsichordist Sabine Bauer and violinist Mary Utiger
 1996: 9 Symphonies by Franz Beck
 2001: Stabat Mater by Franz Beck, with Sandrine Piau, Klaus Mertens and the Vokalensemble of the SWR
 2003: Klavierkonzerte op.11 Nr.1-6, concertos for harpsichord and fortepiano by Karl Friedrich Abel, with Sabine Bauer
 2004: Harpsichord Concertos by Jiří Antonín Benda (Georg Anton Benda), with Sabine Bauer
 2008: Miserere / Requiem / Stella coeli by Joseph Martin Kraus with the Deutscher Kammerchor.
 2009: Flute Concertos by Ignaz Holzbauer
 2011: 5 Sinfonias by Gaspard Fritz
 2015: Symphonies op.7 by Karl Friedrich Abel

References

External links
 
 

Baroque music groups
German classical music groups
Music in Frankfurt